The 1987–88 season was Sport Lisboa e Benfica's 84th season in existence and the club's 54th consecutive season in the top flight of Portuguese football, covering the period from 1 July 1987 to 30 June 1988. Benfica competed domestically in the Primeira Divisão,  Taça de Portugal and the Supertaça Cândido de Oliveira, and participated in the  European Cup after winning the previous league.

Despite a league and cup double, John Mortimore was replaced with Ebbe Skovdahl, who failed to meet expectations, being sacked before the end of November. With the league out of reach, Benfica focused on their European campaign, now with Toni at the helm. Eliminating Partizani Tirana, Aarhus, Anderlecht and Steaua București, Benfica met PSV Eindhoven in the European Cup Final. Without a key player like Diamantino, Benfica employed a cautious tactic, with the final being decided on the penalty-spot, where they lost, after van Breukelen defended a shot from Veloso. Domestically, Benfica came second behind Porto, and was knocked-out of the Portuguese Cup by the same team.

Season summary
Benfica entered the new season with a change in the presidency and a new manager. Even before John Mortimore led the team to a league and cup double, there were discussion in the media of him being replaced by Sven-Göran Eriksson. A day after the victory in the 1987 Taça de Portugal Final, Benfica confirmed that Mortimore was leaving. To fit in new President João Santos electoral strategy, for a "European Benfica", several names were discussed, such as Carlos Alberto Parreira, Telê Santana and Javier Clemente. Benfica approached Clemente, but insisted more on Gunder Bengtsson, who had just won the UEFA Cup. After Bengtsson declined the offer, Benfica turned to Ebbe Skovdahl, 42-year old Danish manager, who last managed Brøndby. In the transfer market, Benfica added several players, most notably, Elzo Coelho, Fernando Chalana, Carlos Mozer and Mats Magnusson. Departures included
António Bastos Lopes, Minervino Pietra, José Luís and Michael Manniche, the first two to retirement. The pre-season started on 21 July with medical exams, followed by a trip to Switzerland the next day, where the team would play in the Philips Tournament. The location was also chosen so that they could do altitude training. Afterwards they played in the Teresa Herrera Trophy and Trofeo Colombino. Their presentation game was on 3 August with Vitória de Setúbal. Due to the events of 31 May in Braga, Benfica's first home game was played in Estádio Nacional.

Skovadahl stint at Benfica was a short-lived. Losses against Setúbal, Marítimo and Desportivo de Chaves led to immense pressure from the fans and four months into the season, on 28 November, he was sacked. He left the team 12 rounds into the season already trailing leader Porto by five points. His assistant Toni accepted the invitation to lead the team, in his first experience as manager. In his first game, he lost three-nil at home to Sporting for the Supertaça Cândido de Oliveira.

With little chance of renewing the league title, Benfica focused on their European campaign. In the first round, a 4-0 win against the violent Partizani Tirana saw UEFA expel the Albanians and void the second leg. Afterwards, they knocked-out Aarhus and Anderlecht, reaching the semi-finals with Steaua București, the winners of the 1985–86 European Cup. For the game with Steaua, Toni travelled to Glasgow and asked Graeme Souness for the videotapes of Rangers's games with them. He concluded the threat was Gheorghe Hagi and he needed to be annulled, a task that fell to Shéu, which he perform without mistakes. 
In the second leg, Rui Águas scored twice to put Benfica into their first European Cup final since 1968. The three-year project of a "European Benfica" produced his first result in his first season.

Before the final against PSV Eindhoven, Benfica lost Diamantino, a key player in the team that got severely injured and missed the final. In the final, Benfica also saw Rui Águas leave the pitch in the second half due to injury, forcing Toni to use Wando as forward. Another problem was the brand new socks that the team wore that caused the boots to slide out, with significant problems in traction for the players. The game was described as with the two teams playing cautiously, ending in 0–0, and requiring penalties to decide the winner. After the first set of penalties with all players scoring, the first of the second round of penalties fell to captain Veloso, who saw his shot defended by van Breukelen, awarding the cup to the Dutch team. Breukelen explained that he had a little book where he kept score of the direction the players shot their penalties. Veloso was there with a penalty shot to the right in a tournament in Spain.

A few days later, Benfica closed the season with one-nil loss to Porto in the semi-final of the Taça Portugal. In the league, Benfica ended 15 points behind them in second place.

Competitions

Overall record

Supertaça Cândido de Oliveira

Primeira Divisão

League table

Results by round

Matches

Taça de Portugal

European Cup

First round

Second round

Quarter-final

Semi-final

Final

Friendlies

Player statistics
The squad for the season consisted of the players listed in the tables below, as well as staff member Ebbe Skovdahl (manager),  Toni (manager), Jesualdo Ferreira (assistant manager), Eusébio (assistant manager), Gaspar Ramos (Director of Football), Vieira da Fonseca (Doctor), Amílcar Miranda (Doctor).

|}

Transfers

In

Out

Out by loan

Notes

References

Bibliography
 
 
 
 
 

S.L. Benfica seasons
Benfica